The second season of Love Island premiered August 24, 2020 on CBS. This season was originally scheduled to premiere on May 21, 2020 and was to be taking place in Fiji for second consecutive season; however, when the COVID-19 pandemic in Fiji forced production to postpone indefinitely. CBS later announced that Love Island would be relocated to film in Las Vegas, Nevada at The Cromwell — a casino hotel on the Las Vegas Strip.

Format

Love Island is a reality television program in which a group of contestants, who are referred to as "Islanders", are living in a villa in Las Vegas. The Islanders are cut off from the outside world and are under constant video surveillance. To survive in the villa, the Islanders must be in a relationship with another Islander. The Islanders couple up for the first time on first impressions but they are later forced to "re-couple" at special ceremonies in which they can choose to remain with their current partners or to switch partners. At the villa, the couples must share a bed for sleeping and are permitted to talk with other Islanders at any time, allowing them to get to know everyone. While in the villa, each Islander has his or her own telephone, with which they can contact other Islanders via text and can receive text messages informing them of the latest challenges, dumpings, and re-couplings. The Islanders are presented with many games and challenges that are designed to test their physical and mental abilities, after which the winners are sometimes presented with special prizes, such as a night at the Hideaway or a special date.

Islanders can be eliminated, or "dumped", for several reasons; these include remaining single after a re-coupling and by public vote through the Love Island mobile app. During the show's final week, members of the public vote to decide which couple should win the series; the couple who receive the most votes win.

At the envelope ceremony on finale night, the couple who received the highest number of votes from the public receive two envelopes, one for each partner. One envelope contains  and the other contains nothing. The partner with the  envelope may choose whether to share the money with his or her partner as a test of trust and commitment.

Islanders
On August 17, 2020, the initial islanders were revealed.

Future appearances
Jeremiah White and Lauren Coogan competed on the thirty-seventh season of The Challenge. Lauren also appeared in episode 6 of HBO Max series FBOY Island. Sher Suarez appeared on the fifth season of MTV's Ex on the Beach.

Johnny Middlebrooks competed on Paramount+ original All Star Shore and competed on the thirty-eighth season of The Challenge. Cely Vazquez and Justine Ndiba competed on The Challenge: USA. In 2023, Ndiba returned to compete on The Challenge: World Championship.

Mackenzie Dipman appeared in the sixth season of Summer House (2017 TV series). She later returned for the fourth season of Love Island USA.

Episodes

Production
CBS originally announced on February 14, 2020 the second season would premiere on May 21, 2020, scheduled to take place in Fiji, and was initially to end at the end of June before the Fourth of July holiday to avoid scheduling conflicts with the 2020 Summer Olympics in Tokyo, Japan. The second season was subsequently placed on hold with a new season premiere date to be determined after the network announced on April 7 they would launch CBS Sunday Movie for a five-week run starting on May 3 after television productions were shut down due to the ongoing COVID-19 pandemic. An article from The Hollywood Reporter on April 7, 2020 noted that CBS would be without new seasons of Big Brother and Love Island during the summer. Unnamed sources to the publication said the network would rely on repeats of their scripted shows that "have historically repeated well." Kelly Kahl, President of CBS Entertainment, said the network was "optimistic" about airing both shows during the summer "a little later than usual" in an interview with Deadline Hollywood on May 19, 2020.

CBS revealed on July 23, 2020 that the next season of Big Brother would premiere on August 5 with new protocols to protect the cast and crew from COVID-19. The day prior, Vulture reported that pre-production has started on the second season of Love Island. Filming for the second season took place at The Cromwell in Las Vegas on a bio-secure bubble zone instead of an international destination like with season one due to international travel restrictions related to COVID-19. The network and ITV required everyone involved with the show to undergo quarantine prior to the beginning of production.

Coupling and elimination history

Notes

:  Johnny entered after the initial coupling and was told that after twenty-four hours he'd be allowed to steal a girl from another guy. 
:    America voted for the most compatible couples, with the three couples with the most votes being safe. The 3 saved couples then had to collectively save one more couple. The saved couples saved Connor & Mackenzie, leaving Kierstan & Carrington, and Lauren & Tre vulnerable. The four saved boys then had to decide which vulnerable woman to dump from the villa, choosing Lauren, and the 4 saved girls had to decide which vulnerable man to dump from the villa, choosing Tre.
:  As the final part for the Casa Amor twist in week 3, Casa Amor and the villa held two separate re-coupling ceremonies for the original islanders to choose whether to return to their previous partner or pick any new partner. Any of the 10 new islanders that remained single by the end of either ceremony was dumped from the villa. However, if one of the 10 original islanders remained single at the end of both ceremonies, they would still remain in the villa, but as a single islander. GiNiele, Faith, Mercades, Mike, Pat and De'Andre remained single at the end the night, and were all dumped from the villa.
:   America voted for the most compatible couples, with the four couples with the most votes being safe. The boys from the 4 saved couples then had to collectively save one more girl and the saved girls had to save one more boy.  The boys saved Laurel and the girls saved Carrington.
 : America voted for which couple they think should win Love Island. The couple with the most votes were declared the winners of Love Island and received the grand prize money.

Viewing figures

References

2020 American television seasons
Television productions postponed due to the COVID-19 pandemic
Television shows shot in the Las Vegas Valley